Meera Joshi is an American attorney and government official who has served as a deputy mayor of New York City since January 2022. She previously served as the deputy and acting administrator of the Federal Motor Carrier Safety Administration and New York City Taxi and Limousine Commissioner.

Early life and education 
Joshi was born and raised in Philadelphia. She earned a Bachelor of Arts degree from the University of Pennsylvania and a Juris Doctor from the University of Pennsylvania Law School.

Career 
From 1996 to 2000, Joshi was an associate attorney at Latham & Watkins. From 2000 to 2002, she was an associate at Morvillo Abramowitz Grand Iason & Anello PC. From 2002 to 2008, Joshi served as inspector general of the New York City Department of Correction. She was also the deputy director of the Civilian Complaint Review Board. In September 2011, Joshi joined the New York City Taxi and Limousine Commission, serving as deputy commissioner of legal affairs. She was later nominated as CEO and commission chair by Bill de Blasio on March 8, 2014, and confirmed on April 10, 2014. In 2019, Joshi was a visiting scholar at the Rudin Center for Transportation Policy & Management. Joshi left the Taxi and Limousine Commission in March 2019, and from 2020 to 2021, she was General Manager for the New York Office at Sam Schwartz Engineering.

In January 2021, Joshi joined the Federal Motor Carrier Safety Administration as deputy and acting administrator. On April 14, 2021, she was nominated to serve as administrator of the organization. On April 15, 2021, her nomination was sent to the Senate. Joshi withdrew her nomination after being appointed as a deputy mayor of New York City in December 2021.

References 

Living people
University of Pennsylvania alumni
University of Pennsylvania Law School alumni
Deputy mayors of New York City
United States Department of Transportation officials
Biden administration personnel
Politicians from Philadelphia
1969 births